Musa Kuhkan (also Romanized as Mūsá Kūhkan; also known as Deh-e Mūsá Kūkān) is a village in Margan Rural District, in the Central District of Hirmand County, Sistan and Baluchestan Province, Iran. At the 2006 census, its population was 163, in 36 families.

References 

Populated places in Hirmand County